Adotada is a Brazilian reality television series that aired on MTV starring Maria Eugênia Suconic. It is a spin-off of Papito in Love on which Maria previously gained fame for being ex-girlfriend of the singer Supla. The series consists in Maria being "adopted" by a different family each episode, then having to adapt to their routines and write them a letter containing her impressions from the experience before leaving and it ran from September 9, 2014 until July 18, 2017 over four seasons. The show has been nominated for the International Emmy Awards in the Non-Scripted Entertainment category.

Cast

Main
Maria Eugênia Suconic "Mareu"

Recurring
Supla - ex boyfriend 
Cleber Tumasonis - best friend 
Érica Suconic - best friend and cousin 
Nilo Caprioli - best friend

Episodes

Awards and nominations

References

External links

 

Brazilian reality television series
2014 Brazilian television series debuts
2017 Brazilian television series endings
MTV original programming
Television shows set in Brazil
Reality television spin-offs